Ukhtoma is a rural locality (a selo) in Lipinoborskoye Rural Settlement, Vashkinsky District, Vologda Oblast, Russia. The population was 143 as of 2002. There are 11 streets.

Geography 
Ukhtoma is located 11 km southeast of Lipin Bor (the district's administrative centre) by road. Pereyezd is the nearest rural locality.

References 

Rural localities in Vashkinsky District